The 1926 Pennsylvania gubernatorial election occurred on November 2, 1926. Incumbent Republican  governor Gifford Pinchot was not a candidate for re-election. Republican candidate John Fisher defeated Democratic candidate Eugene C. Bonniwell to become Governor of Pennsylvania. Edward E. Beidleman, Thomas Wharton Phillips Jr., and John K. Tener unsuccessfully sought the Republican nomination.

Results

|-
|-bgcolor="#EEEEEE"
| colspan="3" align="right" | Totals
| align="right" | 1,503,600
| align="right" | 100.00%
|}

References

1926
Gubernatorial
Pennsylvania
November 1926 events